Dorin Dumitru Velicu (born in Hunedoara on 29 November 1986) is a skeleton racer who competed for Romania at the 2014 Winter Olympics and at the 2018 Winter Olympics.

References

External links
 

Sportspeople from Hunedoara
Olympic skeleton racers of Romania
Romanian male skeleton racers
Skeleton racers at the 2014 Winter Olympics
Skeleton racers at the 2018 Winter Olympics
1986 births
Living people